Calleida is a genus of beetles in the family Carabidae.

See also
 List of Calleida species

References

Lebiinae